John Harrison Prescott (fourth ¼ 1890 – 1989) was an English professional rugby league footballer who played in the 1900s, 1910s and 1920s.

Background
John Harrison Prescott a.k.a. Jack Prescott was born on 11th September 1890 at 2 Prescott's Yard, Wigan, Lancashire, England, he served with the Royal Engineers during World War I from 1915 to 1919.

Playing career

Championship final appearances
Jack Prescott played in Wigan's victory as league leaders in the Championship during the 1908–09 season.

County League appearances
Jack Prescott played in Wigan's victories in the Lancashire County League during the 1908–09 season, 1910–11 season, 1911–12 season, 1912–13 season and 1913–14 season.

County Cup Final appearances
Jack Prescott played , and was captain in Warrington's 7-5 victory over Oldham in the 1921–22 Lancashire County Cup Final during the 1921–22 season at The Cliff, Broughton, Salford on Saturday 3 December 1921, in front of a crowd of 18,000.

Club career
Jack Prescott made his début for Wigan in the 56-0 victory over Aberdare RLFC at Ynys Field, Aberdare on Saturday 5 September 1908, he scored his first try for Wigan on his début, he scored his last try for Wigan in the 24-8  victory over Oldham in the Lancashire County Cup second-round match at Central Park, Wigan on Saturday 2 November 1912, he played his last match for Wigan in the 13-2 victory over Runcorn RFC in the 1914 Challenge Cup second-round match at Canal Street, Runcorn on Saturday 14 March 1914, he was transferred from Wigan to Hull Kingston Rovers during May 1914, he was transferred from Hull Kingston Rovers to Warrington, he made his début for Warrington on Saturday 28 August 1920, and he played his last match for Warrington on Tuesday 27 December 1921, he appears to have scored no drop-goals (or field-goals as they are currently known in Australasia), but prior to the 1974–75 season all goals, whether; conversions, penalties, or drop-goals, scored 2-points, consequently prior to this date drop-goals were often not explicitly documented, therefore '0' drop-goals may indicate drop-goals not recorded, rather than no drop-goals scored. In addition, prior to the 1949–50 season, the archaic field-goal was also still a valid means of scoring points.

References

External links
Search for "Prescott" at rugbyleagueproject.org
Search for "Jack Prescott" at britishnewspaperarchive.co.uk

1890 births
1989 deaths
British Army personnel of World War I
English rugby league players
Hull Kingston Rovers players
Place of death missing
Royal Engineers soldiers
Rugby league centres
Rugby league five-eighths
Rugby league halfbacks
Rugby league players from Wigan
Warrington Wolves captains
Warrington Wolves players
Wigan Warriors players